Henry Bool (1846–1922) was an American individualist anarchist.  Bool was born in England and in 1872 emigrated to Ithaca, NY, (arriving in New York NY 15 May 1872) where he lived as a businessman for 30 years before returning to England, where he died in Montacute, Somerset, in 1922. While in the U.S. Bool began reading and adopting the philosophy of the American individualist anarchists as his own; he said, "I am a believer in the doctrines of the individualistic school of Anarchists, to which Garrison, Emerson, Proudhon, Thoreau, Spooner, Andrews, Warren and Tucker belong." He is most noted for opposing propaganda by the deed and communist anarchism.

Bool is the author of For Liberty: The World's Thinkers and Government, Political Power and Democracy, Freedom, Co-Operation, and Society Without Government. He also penned several essays and leaflets, including Liberty Without Invasion, Means and End of Progress, Henry Bool's Apology For His Jeffersonian Anarchism, Henry Bool's Creed, and Who's Who? A Discussion Between an Autocratic Democrat and a Government-By-Consent Anarchist.

References

External links
 Henry Bool’s Apology for His Jeffersonian Anarchism by Henry Bool (1901)
 Liberty Without Invasion, Means and End of Progress by Henry Bool (1898)

1922 deaths
American anarchists
English anarchists
British libertarians
Individualist anarchists
1846 births